Timber is an unincorporated community in Washington County, Oregon, United States.

The town is connected to the coast and Portland by US-26 to the north and Oregon Highway 6 to the south. Both highways are served by Timber Road which runs mainly north-south through the center of town.

Climate
This region experiences warm (but not hot) and dry summers and chilly, wet winters, with no average monthly temperatures above 71.6 °F.  According to the Köppen Climate Classification system, Timber has a warm-summer Mediterranean climate, abbreviated "Csb" on climate maps. Timber also sits in a prominent local frost hollow, and is capable of recording sub-32 temperatures any month of the year.

References

External links

Nature of Timber vicinity

Unincorporated communities in Washington County, Oregon
Unincorporated communities in Oregon